CFPG-FM (99.1 FM, Peggy @ 99.1) is a radio station in Winnipeg, Manitoba, Canada. Owned by Corus Entertainment, it broadcasts an adult contemporary format. Its transmitter is located in Duff Roblin Provincial Park, while its studios are located alongside its sister stations at 201 Portage.

History

CJZZ
The station signed on the air on February 28, 2003, owned by Canwest Communications. The frequency was the former home in Winnipeg of all-news radio network CKO for a short period in 1988 and 1989.

Originally the call sign was CJZZ-FM, broadcasting a smooth jazz format from the Starbuck Communications Tower. But Canwest found this caused multipath interference to occur, so the company applied to the CRTC to broadcast from a new transmitter that Rogers Communications was constructing. and to decrease the ERP from 100,000 to 63,700 watts. At this time the station was branded as 99.1 Cool FM, a tie-in for co-owned cable TV station CoolTV.

CJGV
In September 2006, Corus Entertainment, already owner of Winnipeg's CJOB and CJKR-FM, announced it would buy CJZZ and Kitchener, Ontario's CKBT-FM, from CanWest, subject to CRTC approval. The transaction was approved by the CRTC on July 6, 2007. Corus Entertainment officially took ownership of CJZZ on July 29, 2007. On November 5, 2007, the station rebranded as Groove FM, and changed its call letters to CJGV-FM.

In April 2010, Corus Radio Winnipeg announced the future relocation of its radio broadcast facility to 1440 Rapelje Avenue (since renamed Jack Blick Avenue), as part of a lease agreement between Corus Entertainment and Cadillac Fairview. The relocation to studios and offices in Polo Park was originally slated for January 2011. CJOB, CJGV and CJKR would become the anchor tenants.

In August 2011, Corus filed an application with the CRTC to remove the requirement for the station to broadcast a specialty smooth jazz format, citing significant financial losses in recent years. On November 30, 2011, the CRTC approved CJGV's application, although requiring it to maintain two hours of smooth jazz content per-week.

Switch to AC
On December 1, 2011, the station began playing Christmas music for the holiday season, and announced plans to flip to adult contemporary on January 1, 2012. On that date, CJGV flipped to a hot adult contemporary format branded as simply 99.1 FM, before ultimately adopting Corus's "Fresh FM" brand on February 14, 2012. On February 13, 2015, the station rebranded as 99.1 Fresh Radio, and switched to a modern adult contemporary format, and added more alternative songs.

On November 9, 2016, Corus released morning show hosts Vicki Shae and Sean Dilworth as part of a station restructure. Running without DJs and airing Christmas music during the holiday season, rumors spread that the station would flip to classic hits as Boom 99.1, or to an FM simulcast of sister station CJOB (a move that would have required CRTC approval, as it would require a change of the description of its format.)

On December 25, 2016, at 5 p.m., following the conclusion of its Christmas music programming, CJGV re-launched as Peggy @ 99.1, an adult contemporary format featuring current music and past hits going back to the 1980s. Corus described the station as reflecting "the positive, energetic and fun vibe of Winnipeg while giving listeners the music they want." The first song on "Peggy" was Girls Just Wanna Have Fun by Cyndi Lauper. In March 2017, its call letters were changed to CFPG-FM to match the new branding.

References

External links
 Peggy @ 99.1
 

Fpg
FPG
FPG
Radio stations established in 2007
2007 establishments in Manitoba